Mehmet Eren Boyraz (born October 11, 1981) is a Turkish football attacking midfielder.

Honours 
 Kayserispor
Turkish Cup (1): 2008

References

External links

 Guardian Stats Centre

1981 births
Living people
Turkish footballers
Turkey B international footballers
Beylerbeyi S.K. footballers
Eskişehirspor footballers
Kayseri Erciyesspor footballers
Kayserispor footballers
Antalyaspor footballers
Adana Demirspor footballers
Süper Lig players
TFF First League players
Association football midfielders